This is a list of vegetarian or vegan organizations. Vegetarian organizations are located in numerous locations and regions around the globe. Their main goal is to promote vegetarianism among the public and to support and link individuals and organizations that practice, promote or endorse vegetarianism.

The biggest vegetarian organizations are the International Vegetarian Union (IVU) and Vegan World Alliance (VWA), which act as a connecting umbrella organization.

Campaigns and events 

 Meat-free day
 Meatless Monday
 Vegetarian week
 Veggie Pride
 World Vegan Day
 World Vegetarian Day

See also 
 List of vegetarian and vegan companies
 List of vegetarian festivals (including vegan festivals)
 List of fictional vegetarian characters

References

 
Vegetarian communities